Ziziphus spina-christi, known as the Christ's thorn jujube, is an evergreen tree or plant native to northern and tropical Africa, Southern and Western Asia. It is native to the Levant, East Africa, Mesopotamia and some tropical countries. Fruit and leaves from the tree were used in preparing ancient Egyptian foods and cultural practices.

Ecology
In the Levant, it grows in valleys up to an elevation of 500 m. The ripe fruits are edible. The seed, contained within a small, oblong woody pit, is opened and eaten by local fauna, including the rock hyrax.

Cultural and religious references
In the Levant and wider Middle East it is called sidr (associated with the lote tree of the Quran) and is common in the Jordan Valley and around Jerusalem, as well as in the Hajar Mountains of the Sultanate of Oman. There were some folklore traditions that said the trees were protected by benevolent spirits or dead saints. By some traditions, it was the tree from which Jesus' crown of thorns was made. Matthew George Easton argues that Z. spina-christi is too brittle to be bent into a crown, and suggests another local plant, Ziziphus lotus.

The oldest known Z. spina-christi is located in Ir Ovot, in the south of Israel. It is estimated to be between 1500 and 2000 years old. It is believed locally to be the very tree from which Jesus' crown of thorns was made. It is the national tree of Qatar and the symbol of the central Arava.

Gallery

References

Bibliography

External links

 Thorns of Ziziphus spina-christi
 Flowers in Israel - Ziziphus spina-christi

Fruits originating in Africa
Trees of Africa
Trees of Asia
Desert fruits
Flora of North Africa
Flora of Northeast Tropical Africa
Flora of Western Asia
Trees in religion
spina-christi